Mark S. Massa (born March 6, 1961) is an American judge who has served as an Associate Justice of the Indiana Supreme Court since April 2, 2012, when he succeeded Randall T. Shepard.

Born in Milwaukee, Wisconsin, Massa moved to Indiana in 1979 to attend Indiana University, from which he received a Bachelor of Arts in Journalism in 1983. Massa interned at the South Bend Tribune and Milwaukee Journal Sentinel before becoming a sportswriter for the Evansville Courier & Press, where he also covered the courts and local government.

In 1985, he became a deputy press secretary and speechwriter for Governor Robert D. Orr. He then attended the evening division of Indiana University Robert H. McKinney School of Law, and was a law clerk for Indiana Supreme Court Chief Justice Randall Shepard from 1991 to 1993. 

In March 2012, Governor Mitch Daniels appointed Massa to the Indiana Supreme Court.

In 2018, Massa authored an opinion of the court holding that Indiana's shoreline on Lake Michigan was open to all, barring adjacent property owners from excluding others from such land.

References

1961 births
Living people
Lawyers from Milwaukee
Justices of the Indiana Supreme Court
Indiana Republicans
21st-century American judges
Indiana University Robert H. McKinney School of Law alumni
Indiana University alumni
Assistant United States Attorneys